The Forty-Year-Old Version is a 2020 American comedy-drama film written, directed, and produced by Radha Blank, in her feature directorial debut. It stars Blank, Peter Kim, Oswin Benjamin, and Reed Birney.

Loosely based on Blank's own life, the film sees her playing Radha, a playwright and teacher who turns to rapping when she finds herself nearing her 40th birthday.

It had its world premiere at the Sundance Film Festival on January 25, 2020, where Blank won the U.S Dramatic Competition Directing Award, and was released on October 9, 2020, by Netflix. It was named one of the ten best films of 2020 by the National Board of Review.

Plot 
Radha is a playwright and teacher nearing her 40th birthday and living under the burden of the unfulfilled promise of a 30 under 30 award she won nearly a decade ago. Archie, her agent and friend, gives her latest play Harlem Ave to J. Whitman, a wealthy white producer, who suggests her work needs to focus more on Black suffering. After he offers her a job writing for a Harriet Tubman musical, Radha throttles him. At a loss over what to do with her career, she hears rap music  blasting outside her apartment and is inspired to start writing raps, following a passion she developed and abandoned in high school. Tracking down D, a music producer, she invents the name RadhaMUSprime. Her agent believes she is going through a breakdown.

D is initially distant towards her, but after they create a track together, Radha is shocked to find him willing to record a mixtape with her. D also invites Radha to perform at a showcase for up-and-coming rappers. Before the showcase Radha gets high and forgets her lyrics, leading her to humiliate herself in front of a crowd of her students.

Archie uses the recent death of Radha's mother to smooth things over with Whitman, who agrees to produce Harlem Ave. However, he tells her to add a white character to her play. As the play progresses to the workshop stage, Radha increasingly feels uncomfortable with the compromises she is making to appeal to white audiences.

Despite witnessing her bombing on stage, D encourages Radha to continue rapping. After taking her to an all-woman rap battle in the Bronx, the two spend the night together and open up about their lives as struggling artists and the way they are coping with the recent loss of their mothers. However, Radha brushes him off the next morning, telling him she needs to work on her play.

Radha continues to struggle with the compromises she makes to have the play produced. Cleaning out her mother's apartment with her brother, she reflects on her mother's career as a struggling artist. She is surprised and encouraged to see that her brother views their mother as a talented Renaissance woman rather than as a failure.

On her play's opening night, Radha appears during the curtain call and denounces her work, rapping about the need for an artist to stay true to their artistic vision. She fires Archie at the same time he quits and then heads to D's apartment to reunite with him. The film ends with the two walking together, him beatboxing and her rapping, as the shot slowly changes from black and white to color.

Cast

Production
In August 2019, it was announced Radha Blank, Peter Kim, and Oswin Benjamin had joined the cast of the film, with Blank directing from a screenplay she wrote and Lena Waithe producing. The title is a play on the 2005 comedy The 40-Year-Old Virgin.

Release
It had its world premiere at the Sundance Film Festival on January 25, 2020. Shortly after, Netflix acquired distribution rights to the film. It was released on October 9, 2020.

Reception

Critical response
The website's critics consensus reads "The Forty-Year-Old Version opens a compelling window into the ebbs and flows of the artist's life—and announces writer-director-star Radha Blank as a major filmmaking talent with her feature debut." Metacritic assigned the film a weighted average score of 80 out of 100, based on 28 critics, indicating "generally favorable reviews".

Accolades

References

External links
 
 Official website

African-American films
2020 films
American comedy films
Films set in New York City
Films shot in New York City
American black-and-white films
2020 comedy films
English-language Netflix original films
Sundance Film Festival award winners
American independent films
2020 independent films
Films about theatre
2020s English-language films
2020s American films